Hastinapur Gewog is a former gewog (village block) of Samdrup Jongkhar District, Bhutan.

References 

Former gewogs of Bhutan
Samdrup Jongkhar District